The 2003 Rallye Sanremo (formally the 45th Rallye Sanremo - Rallye d'Italia) was the eleventh round of the 2003 World Rally Championship. The race was held over three days between 3 October and 5 October 2003, and was based in Sanremo, Italy. Citroen's Sébastien Loeb won the race, his 4th win in the World Rally Championship.

Background

Entry list

Itinerary
All dates and times are CEST (UTC+2).

Results

Overall

World Rally Cars

Classification

Special stages

Championship standings

Junior World Rally Championship

Classification

Special stages

Championship standings

References

External links 
 Official website of the World Rally Championship

Rallye Sanremo
Rallye Sanremo